Ashlilatar Daye (meaning: "Accusation for vulgarity") is a Bengali drama film released in 1983. The film is based on a thriller cum courtroom drama novel by the Narayan Sanyal with the same title, which was published in 1975. Sanyal took this novel theme from Seven Minutes by Irving Wallace. This film directed by Uma Nath Bhattacharya. Arundhati Holme Chowdhury and Haimanti Sukla sang in this film.

Plot 
The movie is based on a court trial of the case of a Bengali novel which is accused of obscenity. Young advocate Bhaskar defended the case arguing that this novel is not obscene or vulgar at all. Finally is found that a retired judge had written the novel when young and the story of it, was based on his personal experience.

Starring 
 Chiranjeet Chakraborty as Bhaskar
 Alpana Goswami
 Dilip Roy
 Biplab Chatterjee
 Anamika Saha
 Satya Banerjee
 Sanghmitra Banerjee
 Santana Basu

References

External links
 
1983 films
Bengali-language Indian films
1983 drama films
1980s Bengali-language films
Indian drama films
Films based on works by Narayan Sanyal
Indian courtroom films